Gladys Gale (January 15, 1891 – October 4, 1948) was an American nightclub singer and vaudeville performer, before becoming a character actress in films during the 1930s and 1940s.  The wife of a millionaire, she led a checkered life before dying under mysterious circumstances in a Los Angeles hotel room under an assumed name.

Life and early career
Born Gladys Lanphere on January 15, 1891, in Monmouth, Illinois, she married millionaire Park Benjamin. During the Prohibition Era she became a nightclub performer in a speakeasy in New York City, also appearing on the vaudeville stage in the late 1920s and early 1930s.

Film career and death
Gale went to Hollywood in 1931, where she made her film debut in RKO's Smart Woman in a small role. She used the stage name of Gladys Gale, instead of her married name, Gladys Benjamin. Over her fifteen-year film career, she would appear in over 30 feature films, mostly in smaller roles, with the occasional featured part. Some of her more notable films include: the gangster film, She Couldn't Take It (1934), starring George Raft and Joan Bennett; the Mae West 1936 vehicle, Klondike Annie, in which she played a dance hall girl at the age of 45; Frank Capra's 1938 classic, Mr. Smith Goes to Washington, starring James Stewart, Jean Arthur, and Claude Rains; and the 1942 melodrama, Lady for a Night, starring John Wayne and Joan Blondell. Her final screen appearance would be in a small role in Our Hearts Were Growing Up (1946), which starred Gail Russell.

On October 3, 1948, Gale checked into a Los Angeles hotel under an assumed name with a man, calling themselves Mr. and Mrs. Statler. In the morning her body was discovered, nude, with the room trashed. No cause for her death was ever established. Gale is buried in Hollywood Forever Cemetery.

Filmography

Stage

References

External links

1891 births
1948 deaths
20th-century American actresses
Actresses from Illinois
People from Monmouth, Illinois
Burials at Hollywood Forever Cemetery
Vaudeville performers
Nightclub performers